Finn Lambrechts DFC (16 June 1900 – 8 December 1956) was a Norwegian military officer, a lieutenant general of the Royal Norwegian Air Force. He served as Chief of Defence of Norway from 1955 to 1956.

Personal life
Lambrechts was born in Kristiania, the son of county manager Sigurd Lambrechts and Augusta Mowinckel. On 24 June 1929, he married Cuba-born Anita Brøgger.

Career

Early career
Lambrechts graduated as naval officer in 1921, and from the navy's pilot school in 1924. He published the book Lærebok i luftnavigasjon in 1935, and worked as a pilot for the Norwegian Air Lines from 1935 to 1939.

Second World War

During the Second World War, he served as a pilot and aviation officer in Great Britain with the No. 333 Squadron RAF. He was pilot of the first operation using the amphibious aircraft Catalina to land agents on the Norwegian coast on 1 May 1942.

Post war
After the war, Lambrechts served as air attaché in Stockholm from 1945 to 1946.
He was promoted to lieutenant general and head of the Royal Norwegian Air Force in 1951. From 1955 to 1956, he served as Chief of Defence of Norway.

Honours and awards
Lambrechts was decorated Knight of the French Legion of Honour. He was awarded the Norwegian War Cross with Sword and the British Distinguished Flying Cross for achievements during the Second World War.

References

Royal Norwegian Air Force generals
Royal Norwegian Navy Air Service personnel of World War II
Royal Norwegian Air Force personnel of World War II
1900 births
1956 deaths
Chiefs of Defence (Norway)
Norwegian military attachés